is a former Japanese football player.

Club statistics

References

External links

1984 births
Living people
Fukuoka University alumni
Association football people from Kumamoto Prefecture
Japanese footballers
J2 League players
Japan Football League players
Roasso Kumamoto players
V-Varen Nagasaki players
Association football forwards
Expatriate footballers in Thailand
Expatriate soccer players in Australia
Sydney United 58 FC players
Blacktown City FC players
Yuichi Yamauchi